Hong Myong Hui may refer to:

Hong Myong-hui (1888–1968), Korean novelist
Hong Myong-hui (footballer) (born 1991), North Korean footballer